Francis Wollaston (23 November 1731, London – 31 October 1815) was a British astronomer and Church of England priest. He was elected a Fellow of the Royal Society in 1769.

Life
Wollaston was the son of Francis Wollaston (1694–1774) and his wife Mary Fauquier. He was educated privately and at Sidney Sussex College, Cambridge, where he graduated LL.B. in 1754. Though admitted to Lincoln's Inn in 1750, Wollaston never entered the bar, but became a clergyman. Ordained deacon in 1754 and priest in 1755, he became Rector of Dengie in 1758. From 1761 to 1769 he was Rector and Vicar of East Dereham, and from 1769 to 1815 Rector of Chislehurst.

Wollaston wrote a rare privately printed autobiography The Secret History of a Private Man. In it, he explains that his pursuit of astronomy was intended to separate him at a "distance from the misrepresentations of narrow minded biggots." He had a private observatory with a triplet telescope by Peter Dollond. He was buried at Chislehurst.

He achieved some distinction as an astronomer, becoming a member of the Royal Society in 1769 and later serving on its council. He also produced a catalogue of stars and nebulae in 1789, which was used by many including his friend William Herschel.

He is buried in St Nicholas's Churchyard in Chislehurst.

Beliefs
Wollaston was suspected of unorthodox beliefs, perhaps Unitarianism, a denial of the Trinity. His actual belief, which he kept secret, was much more distinctive. It was that "the Archangel Michael had created mankind and was subsequently incarnated as Jesus".

Family
He married Althea Hyde, daughter of John Hyde, in 1758 and they had many children:
 Mary Hyde Wollaston (1760–1843), married, in 1803, William Panchen, vicar of St Mary and St Benedict, Huntingdon
 Althea Hyde Wollaston (1760–1785), married Thomas Heberden (1754–1843), a priest and canon of Exeter Cathedral
 Francis John Hyde Wollaston (1762–1823), philosopher
 Charlotte Hyde Wollaston (1763–1835)
 Katherine Hyde Wollaston (1764–1844), conchologist
 George Hyde Wollaston (1765–1841)
 William Hyde Wollaston (1766–1828), physiologist, chemist, and physicist
 Henrietta Hyde Wollaston (1767–1840)
 Anna Hyde Wollaston (1769–1828), unmarried
 Frederick Hyde Wollaston (1770–1839?; went to America in 1796)
 Louisa Hyde Wollaston (1771–1772)
 Charles Hyde Wollaston (1772–1850)
 Henry Hyde Wollaston (1774), died in infancy
 Amelia Hyde Wollaston (1775–1860)
 Henry Septimus Hyde Wollaston (1776–1867), married Maria Anna Blanckenhagen, the daughter of a well-known merchant family originating from the Baltic.
 Sophia Hyde Wollaston (1777–1810), unmarried
 Louisa Decima Hyde Wollaston (1778–1854), married James Leonard Jackson, a priest from Dorsetshire
 unknown child
 unknown child

References

 Clifford J. Cunningham, The First Asteroid, 2001

External links
 
 A Portraiture of the Heavens, Wollaston's 1811 star atlas, full digital facsimile, Linda Hall Library

Fellows of the Royal Society
1731 births
1815 deaths